Charlie Inukpuk (born 1941) is an Inuk carver from Nunavik.

Early life and education 
He was born in 1941, in Kotak, a place north of Inukjuak. His father Johnny Inukpuk was an artist; he was the eldest son. He learned to carve as a teenager, from watching his father and other local artists.

Career 
His sculptures are often of local animals (including bears), kayak-making, and mothers with children. He also carved heads for dolls that his wife, Elisapee Inukpuk, would make.

His work is held in many institutions worldwide, including the Museum of Anthropology at UBC, the University of Michigan Museum of Art, the Penn Museum, the National Gallery of Canada, the National Museum of the American Indian, the University of Sasketchewan, and the Iowa State University Museums.

References 

1941 births
People from Nunavik
Inuit sculptors
20th-century Canadian sculptors
Inuit from Quebec
Canadian male sculptors
Living people
20th-century Canadian male artists